The second and final season of The Mighty B! began airing in the United States on Nickelodeon on September 21, 2009 and finished airing on Nicktoons on June 18, 2011, but episodes 28 to 40 airs on Nickelodeon (as part of the Nicktoons on Nickelodeon block). In September 2008, the show was renewed for a second season with 20 half-hour episodes.

Nickelodeon's animation president Brown Johnson talked about the show, quoting: "The Mighty B! has become a break-out hit for Nickelodeon, complementing and strengthening our powerhouse Saturday morning line-up [...] Fans can look forward to more of Bessie's dare-to-be-different attitude this season as she chases new badges and comes closer to her dream of becoming the Mighty B."

Episodes

References

External links
 Season 2 at the Internet Movie Database

2009 American television seasons
2010 American television seasons
2011 American television seasons
The Mighty B!